Castanopsis motleyana is a tree in the family Fagaceae. It is named for the botanist James Motley.

Description
The cracked or scaly bark is reddish to brown.

Distribution and habitat
Castanopsis motleyana grows naturally in Borneo and the Philippines. Its habitat is hill dipterocarp forests up to  altitude.

References

motleyana
Trees of Borneo
Trees of the Philippines
Plants described in 1889
Flora of the Borneo lowland rain forests